John Jordan Morgan (1770 – July 29, 1849) was an American politician from New York. From 1821 to 1825, and again briefly from late 1834 to early 1835, he served in the  U.S. House of Representatives.

Life
Morgan was born in Queens County, New York, and attended the public schools.

Political career 
He was a member from New York County of the New York State Assembly in 1819. In 1826, Morgan's adopted daughter Catherine (a niece of his first wife) married John Adams Dix who was then hired by Morgan to look after his land holdings in Cooperstown. Dix later became a US Senator, Union Army General and Governor of New York.

Morgan was elected as a Democratic-Republican to the 17th, and re-elected as a Jacksonian Democratic-Republican to the 18th United States Congress, holding office from December 3, 1821, to March 3, 1825.

Morgan was elected as a Jacksonian to the 23rd United States Congress to fill the vacancy caused by the resignation of Cornelius Van Wyck Lawrence and served from December 1, 1834, to March 3, 1835.

He was again a member of the State Assembly in 1836 and 1840. In February 1841, Morgan was appointed by President Martin Van Buren as Collector of the Port of New York to replace Jesse Hoyt who had been involved in the Swartwout-Hoyt scandal. A month later, Morgan was removed by the new President William Henry Harrison who had defeated Van Buren for re-election.

Death 
Morgan died in Port Chester, Westchester County, New York, and was buried in the Trinity Churchyard in New York City.

Sources

The New York Civil List compiled by Franklin Benjamin Hough (pages 71f, 194, 218, 223 and 293; Weed, Parsons and Co., 1858)

1770 births
1849 deaths
Collectors of the Port of New York
Members of the New York State Assembly
People from Queens, New York
Democratic-Republican Party members of the United States House of Representatives from New York (state)
Jacksonian members of the United States House of Representatives from New York (state)
19th-century American politicians
Members of the United States House of Representatives from New York (state)